Lewis Creek (also called Lewis Fork) is a stream in Valley County, Idaho, in the United States.

The creek was named for explorer Meriwether Lewis.

See also
List of rivers of Idaho

References

Rivers of Valley County, Idaho
Rivers of Idaho